Lake Cacaoui is a lake in the Côte-Nord region of Quebec, Canada.
It drains into the Sainte-Marguerite River.

Location

Lake Cacaoui is in the unorganized territory of Lac-Walker, part of the Sept-Rivières Regional County Municipality.
The Cacaoui River leaves the west of the lake and runs north through a stretch of rapids into the Sainte-Marguerite River.
Little Lake Cacaoui (Petit lac Cacaoui) connects to the main lake at its south end.

Name

The name "Cacaoui" is a variant of kakawi, the local name of the long-tailed duck (Clangula hyemalis).
According to Placide Vigneau (1842−1926), who wrote about the Mingan Archipelago and Havre-Saint-Pierre, the duck's name should be written as kakawit, and the local people of the Havre-Saint-Pierre region pronounce it as cacaoite.
The duck is loquacious, with a musical call that sounds like "ah-ah-wè", which may be the basis for the name.
The name was approved by the  Geography Commission in 1945.

Dam

IOC (Iron Ore Company), a Rio Tinto subsidiary, owns the SM-2 hydroelectric plant on the Sainte-Marguerite River.
IOC also owned the wooden dam on the Cacaoui Lake reservoir.
This dam was built in 1950.
It had fallen into decay and was dismantled in 2010 and replaced with a structure of local rocks to naturally control the water flowing into the western part of the lake.
The work was done by the Groupe Nordique, and involved dismantling several buildings and dams, and recovering iron.

Environment

The lake is in the boreal climate zone.
A map of the Ecological regions of Quebec places the lake in the 6J-S ecological subregion, part of the eastern spruce/moss domain of the boreal zone.
The region is one of mountains that rise high above their surroundings, with rocky escarpments.
The network of lakes and rivers is enclosed in narrow valleys.

The Forêt ancienne du Lac-Cacaoui (Lake Cacaoui Old Growth Forest), an exceptional forest ecosystem occupies part of the southern shore of the lake.
The spruce is dominated by Abies balsamea (balsam fir), which is well adapted to the cold and damp climate.
The  area of old-growth forest was designated IUCN Management Category III at a national level in 2008.
It is managed by the Ministère des Forêts, de la Faune et des Parcs.

Visiting

The lake is within the Matimek zone d'exploitation contrôlée (controlled use zone).
The Zec rents a cabin to visitors that can sleep four people. 
The cabin has a wood stove, propane fridge and cooker, and solar electricity supplying the lighting system.
In September 2018 two brothers died in a boating accident on the lake.

Notes

Sources

Lakes of Côte-Nord